Youssef Fares is a Lebanese neurosurgeon, academic and healthcare leader. He is a Professor and the Dean of the Lebanese University Faculty of Medicine, where he also serves as the founding director of the Neuroscience Research Center.  Fares is also the CEO and Chairman of Al-Zahraa Hospital University Medical Center, the founding president of the Lebanese Association of Spine Surgery and the Senior Executive Vice President of the World Academy of Medical Sciences. In addition, he serves as an editor for the neurosurgical journal Surgical Neurology International.

In March 2020, Fares was elected into the European Academy of Sciences and Arts.

Early life and education
Fares was born and raised in Lebanon. In 1982, he moved to Spain to attain an MD from the University of Granada in 1987 and a PhD in Medicine and Surgery summa cum laude from the Autonomous University of Madrid in 1992. He also finished an Executive MBA with honors from the American University of Technology in 2019.

Career
Since 1994, Fares has been a member of the faculty of medicine at the Lebanese University, where he is a professor. In 2020, he was appointed the Dean of the Faculty of Medicine. In 2014, he established the Neuroscience Research Center at the university that he currently serves as the Founding Director. He previously led the Department of Neurosurgery as its Chairman between 2009 and 2020 and served as the Associate Dean of the Faculty of Medicine from 2012 to 2020.
 
In 2016, Fares was appointed the CEO and Chairman of Al-Zahraa Hospital–University Medical Center, a medical center in Lebanon. He  transitioned the hospital to a full academic medical center.

Fares was appointed as the Senior Executive Vice President of the World Academy of Medical Sciences in 2017. In 2018, he established a headquarters for the academy in Beirut to serve the MENA region.

Fares is a Fellow of the American College of Surgeons, a Fellow of the International College of Surgeons and an International Member of the American Association of Neurological Surgeons.

Research
Fares’s research in neurosurgery, neuroscience and conflict medicine led to more than 100 peer-reviewed publications that range between books, book chapters, original articles, reviews, editorials and conference proceedings. He co-developed the Fares Scale of Injuries due to Cluster Munitions to evaluate functional impairment in victims of cluster munitions.

Honors and awards
Fares was elected into the European Academy of Sciences and Arts in 2020. He is also an elected Fellow of the World Academy of Medical Sciences since 2017.

References

External links 
 

Living people
Lebanese chief executives
Academic staff of Lebanese University
European Academy of Sciences and Arts
Members of the European Academy of Sciences and Arts
Year of birth missing (living people)